Parkandabad (also Romanized as Parkandābād; also known as Parkandehābād and Perkanābād) is a village in Tus Rural District, in the Central District of Mashhad County, Razavi Khorasan Province, Iran. At the 2006 census, its population was 268, in 66 families.

References 

Populated places in Mashhad County